Catoptria montivaga is a moth in the family Crambidae. It was described by Inoue in 1955. It is found in Japan (Honshu).

References

Crambini
Moths described in 1955
Moths of Japan